Millennium Aviation is a passenger Charter airline, operating business jets, based in Reading, Pennsylvania. It is also a fixed-base operator (FBO) at the Reading Regional Airport.

References

Works cited and links
 The Millennium Aviation's official website
 Air Charter Guide

Companies based in Reading, Pennsylvania
Fixed-base operators